"Power House" is a 1994 song by Swedish dance music duo Rob'n'Raz, featuring American singer Lutricia McNeal and rapper D-Flex. It was released as the third and last single from the duo's third album, Spectrum (1993), and peaked at number 12 in Sweden, with a total of 12 weeks within the singles chart. The song also topped the Swedish dance chart and charted in Finland, where it reached number 13.

Track listing
 Sweden, CD maxi (1994)
"Power House" (Radio Version) – 3:10
"Power House" (Extended Version) – 5:48
"Power House" (Drutten & Gena Remix) – 5:32
"Power House" (Album Version) – 4:36
"Power House" (Power Beats) – 2:41

Charts

References

 

1994 singles
1994 songs
English-language Swedish songs
Eurodance songs
Rob'n'Raz songs
Warner Music Group singles